Komsomolsky is a rural locality (a settlement) in Mayskoye Rural Settlement of Koshekhablsky District, Adygea, Russia. The population was 159 as of 2018. There are 4 streets.

Geography 
Komsomolsky is located 9 km west of Koshekhabl (the district's administrative centre) by road. Nechayevsky is the nearest rural locality.

References 

Rural localities in Koshekhablsky District